

Events

Pre-1600
 173 – Marcomannic Wars: The Roman army in Moravia is encircled by the Quadi, who have broken the peace treaty (171). In a violent thunderstorm emperor Marcus Aurelius defeats and subdues them in the so-called "miracle of the rain".
 631 – Emperor Taizong of Tang sends envoys to the Xueyantuo bearing gold and silk in order to seek the release of Chinese prisoners captured during the transition from Sui to Tang.
 786 – A Hasanid Alid uprising in Mecca is crushed by the Abbasids at the Battle of Fakhkh. 
 980 – Vladimir the Great consolidates the Kievan realm from Ukraine to the Baltic Sea. He is proclaimed ruler (knyaz) of all Kievan Rus'.
1011 – Lombard Revolt: Greek citizens of Bari rise up against the Lombard rebels led by Melus and deliver the city to Basil Mesardonites, Byzantine governor (catepan) of the Catepanate of Italy.
1118 – Roger of Salerno, Prince of Antioch, captures Azaz from the Seljuk Turks.
1157 – Albert I of Brandenburg, also called The Bear (Ger: Albrecht der Bär), becomes the founder of the Margraviate of Brandenburg, Germany and the first margrave.
1345 – The megas doux Alexios Apokaukos, chief minister of the Byzantine Empire, is lynched by political prisoners.
1429 – Hundred Years' War: Start of the Battle of Jargeau.
1488 – Battle of Sauchieburn: Fought between rebel Lords and James III of Scotland, resulting in the death of the king.
1509 – Henry VIII of England marries Catherine of Aragon.
1559 – Don Tristan de Luna y Arellano sails for Florida with party of 1,500, intending to settle on gulf coast (Vera Cruz, Mexico).
1594 – Philip II recognizes the rights and privileges of the local nobles and chieftains in the Philippines, which paved way to the stabilization of the rule of the Principalía (an elite ruling class of native nobility in Spanish Philippines).

1601–1900
1748 – Denmark adopts the characteristic Nordic Cross flag later taken up by all other Scandinavian countries.
1770 – British explorer Captain James Cook runs aground on the Great Barrier Reef.
1775 – The American Revolutionary War's first naval engagement, the Battle of Machias, results in the capture of a small British naval vessel.
1776 – The Continental Congress appoints Thomas Jefferson, John Adams, Benjamin Franklin, Roger Sherman, and Robert R. Livingston to the Committee of Five to draft a declaration of independence.
1788 – Russian explorer Gerasim Izmailov reaches Alaska.
1805 – A fire consumes large portions of Detroit in the Michigan Territory.
1825 – The first cornerstone is laid for Fort Hamilton in New York City.
1837 – The Broad Street Riot occurs in Boston, fueled by ethnic tensions between Yankees and Irish.
1865 – The Naval Battle of the Riachuelo is fought on the rivulet Riachuelo (Argentina), between the Paraguayan Navy on one side and the Brazilian Navy on the other. The Brazilian victory was crucial for the later success of the Triple Alliance (Brazil, Uruguay, and Argentina) in the Paraguayan War. 
1892 – The Limelight Department, one of the world's first film studios, is officially established in Melbourne, Australia.
1895 – Paris–Bordeaux–Paris, sometimes called the first automobile race in history or the "first motor race", takes place.
1898 – The Hundred Days' Reform, a planned movement to reform social, political, and educational institutions in China, is started by the Guangxu Emperor, but is suspended by Empress Dowager Cixi after 104 days. (The failed reform led to the abolition of the Imperial examination in 1905.)

1901–present
1901 – The boundaries of the Colony of New Zealand are extended by the UK to include the Cook Islands.
1903 – A group of Serbian officers storms the royal palace and assassinates King Alexander I of Serbia and his wife, Queen Draga.
1917 – King Alexander assumes the throne of Greece after his father, Constantine I, is deemed to have abdicated under pressure from allied armies occupying Athens.
1919 – Sir Barton wins the Belmont Stakes, becoming the first horse to win the U.S. Triple Crown.
1920 – During the U.S. Republican National Convention in Chicago, U.S. Republican Party leaders gathered in a room at the Blackstone Hotel to come to a consensus on their candidate for the U.S. presidential election, leading the Associated Press to coin the political phrase "smoke-filled room".
1935 – Inventor Edwin Armstrong gives the first public demonstration of FM broadcasting in the United States at Alpine, New Jersey.
1936 – The London International Surrealist Exhibition opens.
1937 – Great Purge: The Soviet Union under Joseph Stalin executes eight army leaders.
1938 – Second Sino-Japanese War: The Battle of Wuhan starts.
1940 – World War II: The Siege of Malta begins with a series of Italian air raids.
1942 – World War II: The United States agrees to send Lend-Lease aid to the Soviet Union.
  1942   – Free French Forces retreat from Bir Hakeim after having successfully delayed the Axis advance.
1944 – , the last battleship built by the United States Navy and future site of the signing of the Japanese Instrument of Surrender, is commissioned.
1955 – Eighty-three spectators are killed and at least 100 are injured after an Austin-Healey and a Mercedes-Benz collide at the 24 Hours of Le Mans, the deadliest ever accident in motorsports.
1956 – Start of Gal Oya riots, the first reported ethnic riots that target minority Sri Lankan Tamils in the Eastern Province. The total number of deaths is reportedly 150.
1962 – Frank Morris, John Anglin and Clarence Anglin allegedly become the only prisoners to escape from the prison on Alcatraz Island.
1963 – American Civil Rights Movement: Governor of Alabama George Wallace defiantly stands at the door of Foster Auditorium at the University of Alabama in an attempt to block two black students, Vivian Malone and James Hood, from attending that school. Later in the day, accompanied by federalized National Guard troops, they are able to register.
  1963   – Buddhist monk Thích Quảng Đức burns himself with gasoline in a busy Saigon intersection to protest the lack of religious freedom in South Vietnam.
  1963   – John F. Kennedy addresses Americans from the Oval Office proposing the Civil Rights Act of 1964, which would revolutionize American society by guaranteeing equal access to public facilities, ending segregation in education, and guaranteeing federal protection for voting rights.
1964 – World War II veteran Walter Seifert attacks an elementary school in Cologne, Germany, killing at least eight children and two teachers and seriously injuring several more with a home-made flamethrower and a lance.
1968 – Lloyd J. Old identified the first cell surface antigens that could differentiate among different cell types. 
1970 – After being appointed on May 15, Anna Mae Hays and Elizabeth P. Hoisington officially receive their ranks as U.S. Army Generals, becoming the first women to do so.
1971 – The U.S. Government forcibly removes the last holdouts to the Native American Occupation of Alcatraz, ending 19 months of control.
1978 – Altaf Hussain founds the student political movement All Pakistan Muhajir Students Organisation (APMSO) in Karachi University.
1981 – A magnitude 6.9 earthquake at Golbaf, Iran, kills at least 2,000.
1987 – Diane Abbott, Paul Boateng and Bernie Grant are elected as the first black MPs in Great Britain.
1998 – Compaq Computer pays US$9 billion for Digital Equipment Corporation in the largest high-tech acquisition.
2001 – Timothy McVeigh is executed for his role in the Oklahoma City bombing.
2002 – Antonio Meucci is acknowledged as the first inventor of the telephone by the United States Congress.
2004 – Cassini–Huygens makes its closest flyby of the Saturn moon Phoebe.
2007 – Mudslides in Chittagong, Bangladesh, kill 130 people.
2008 – Canadian Prime Minister Stephen Harper makes a historic official apology to Canada's First Nations in regard to abuses at a Canadian Indian residential school.
  2008   – The Fermi Gamma-ray Space Telescope is launched into orbit.
2010 – The first African FIFA World Cup kicks off in South Africa.
2012 – More than 80 people die in a landslide triggered by two earthquakes in Afghanistan; an entire village is buried. 
2013 – Greece's public broadcaster ERT is shut down by then-prime minister Antonis Samaras. It would open exactly two years later by then-prime minister Alexis Tsipras.

Births

Pre-1600
1403 – John IV, Duke of Brabant (d. 1427)
1456 – Anne Neville, Princess of Wales and Queen of England (d. 1485)
1540 – Barnabe Googe, English poet and translator (d. 1594)
1555 – Lodovico Zacconi, Italian composer and theorist (d. 1627)
1572 – Ben Jonson, English poet, playwright, and critic (d. 1637)
1585 – Evert Horn, Swedish soldier (d. 1615)
1588 – George Wither, English poet (d. 1667)

1601–1900
1620 – John Moore, English businessman and politician, Lord Mayor of London (d. 1702)
1655 – Antonio Cifrondi, Italian painter (d. 1730)
1662 – Tokugawa Ienobu, Japanese shōgun (d. 1712)
1672 – Francesco Antonio Bonporti, Italian priest and composer (d. 1749)
1690 – Giovanni Antonio Giay, Italian composer (d. 1764)
1696 – James Francis Edward Keith, Scottish-Prussian field marshal (d. 1758)
1697 – Francesco Antonio Vallotti, Italian organist and composer (d. 1780)
1704 – Carlos Seixas, Portuguese harpsichord player and composer (d. 1742)
1709 – Joachim Martin Falbe, German painter (d. 1782)
1712 – Benjamin Ingham, American missionary (d. 1772)
1723 – Johann Georg Palitzsch, German astronomer (d. 1788)
1726 – Infanta Maria Teresa Rafaela of Spain (d. 1746)
1741 – Joseph Warren, American physician and general (d. 1775)
1776 – John Constable, English painter and academic (d. 1837)
1796 – François-Louis Cailler, Swiss chocolatier (d. 1852)
1797 – José Trinidad Reyes, Honduran philosopher and theorist (d. 1855)
1807 – James F. Schenck, American admiral (d. 1882)
1815 – Julia Margaret Cameron, Indian-Sri Lankan photographer (d. 1879)
1818 – Alexander Bain, Scottish philosopher and academic (d. 1903)
1829 – Edward Braddon, English-Australian politician, 18th Premier of Tasmania (d. 1904)
1832 – Lucy Pickens, American wife of Francis Wilkinson Pickens (d. 1899)
1834 – Johann Bauschinger, German mechanical engineer and physicist (d. 1893)
1842 – Carl von Linde, German engineer and academic (d. 1934)
1846 – William Louis Marshall, American general and engineer (d. 1920)
1847 – Millicent Fawcett, English academic and activist (d. 1929)
1861 – Alexander Peacock, Australian politician, 20th Premier of Victoria (d. 1933)
1864 – Richard Strauss, German composer and conductor (d. 1949)
1867 – Charles Fabry, French physicist and academic (d. 1945)
1871 – Stjepan Radić, Croatian lawyer and politician (d. 1928)
1876 – Alfred L. Kroeber, American-French anthropologist and ethnologist (d. 1960)
1877 – Renée Vivien, English-French poet and author (d. 1909)
1879 – Roger Bresnahan, American baseball player and manager (d. 1944)
1880 – Jeannette Rankin, American social worker and politician (d. 1973)
1881 – Spiros Xenos, Greek-Swedish painter (d. 1963)
  1881   – Mordecai Kaplan, Lithuanian rabbi, founded Reconstructionist Judaism (d. 1983)
  1881   – Maggie Gripenberg, Finnish dancer and choreographer (d. 1976)
1888 – Bartolomeo Vanzetti, Italian-American anarchist and convicted criminal (d. 1927)
1889 – Hugo Wieslander, Swedish decathlete (d. 1976)
1894 – Kiichiro Toyoda, Japanese businessman, founded Toyota (d. 1952)
1895 – Nikolai Bulganin, Soviet politician (d. 1975)
1897 – Ram Prasad Bismil, Indian activist, founded the Hindustan Republican Association (d. 1927)
  1897   – Reg Latta, Australian rugby league player  (d. 1970)
1899 – Yasunari Kawabata, Japanese novelist and short story writer Nobel Prize laureate (d. 1972)

1901–present
1901 – Cap Fear, Canadian football player and rower (d. 1978)
  1901   – Benny Wearing, Australian rugby league player  (d. 1968)
1902 – Eric Fraser, British illustrator and graphic designer (d. 1983)
1903 – Ernie Nevers, American football player and coach (d. 1976)
1908 – Karl Hein, German hammer thrower (d. 1982)
  1908   – Francisco Marto, Portuguese saint (d. 1919)
1909 – Natascha Artin Brunswick, German-American mathematician and photographer (d. 2003)
1910 – Carmine Coppola, American flute player and composer (d. 1991)
  1910   – Jacques Cousteau, French biologist, author, and inventor, co-developed the aqua-lung (d. 1997)
1912 – James Algar, American director, producer, and screenwriter (d. 1998)
  1912   – William Baziotes, American painter and academic (d. 1963)
  1912   – Mohammad Hassan Ganji, Iranian meteorologist and academic (d. 2012)
1913 – Vince Lombardi, American football player, coach, and manager (d. 1970)
  1913   – Risë Stevens, American soprano and actress (d. 2013)
1914 – Jan Hendrik van den Berg, Dutch psychiatrist and academic (d. 2012)
1915 – Magda Gabor, Hungarian-American actress (d. 1997)
  1915   – Nicholas Metropolis, American mathematician and physicist (d. 1999)
1918 – Ruth Aarons, American table tennis player and manager (d. 1980)
1919 – Suleiman Mousa, Jordanian historian and author (d. 2008)
  1919   – Richard Todd, Irish-English actor (d. 2009)
1920 – Hazel Scott, Trinidadian-American singer, actress, and pianist (d. 1981)
  1920   – Keith Seaman, Australian lawyer and politician, 29th Governor of South Australia (d. 2013)
1922 – Jean Sutherland Boggs, Peruvian-Canadian historian, academic, and civil servant (d. 2014)
  1922   – Michael Cacoyannis, Greek Cypriot director, producer, and screenwriter (d. 2011)
1925 – Johnny Esaw, Canadian sportscaster (d. 2013)
  1925   – William Styron, American novelist and essayist (d. 2006) 
1926 – Carlisle Floyd, American composer and educator (d. 2021)
1927 – Beryl Grey, English ballerina (d. 2022)
  1927   – John W. O'Malley, American Catholic historian, academic and Jesuit priest (d. 2022)
  1927   – Kit Pedler, English parapsychologist and author (d. 1981)
1928 – Queen Fabiola of Belgium (d. 2014)
1929 – Ayhan Şahenk, Turkish businessman (d. 2001)
1930 – Charles Rangel, American soldier, lawyer, and politician
1932 – Athol Fugard, South African-American actor, director, and playwright
  1932   – Tim Sainsbury, English businessman and politician, Minister of State for Trade
1933 – Gene Wilder, American actor, director, and screenwriter (d. 2016)
1937 – Chad Everett, American actor and director (d. 2012)
  1937   – Robin Warren, Australian pathologist and academic, Nobel Prize laureate
1939 – Rachael Heyhoe Flint, Baroness Heyhoe Flint, English cricketer and journalist (d. 2017)
  1939   – Jackie Stewart, Scottish racing driver and sports presenter 
1942 – Parris Glendening, American politician, 59th Governor of Maryland
1943 – Henry Hill, American mobster (d. 2012)
1945 – Adrienne Barbeau, American actress  
1948 – Dave Cash, American baseball player and coach 
  1948   – Lalu Prasad Yadav, Indian politician, 20th Chief Minister of Bihar
1949 – Frank Beard, American drummer and songwriter
1950 – Lynsey de Paul, English singer-songwriter, pianist, producer, cartoonist and actress (d. 2014)
  1950   – Graham Russell, English-Australian singer-songwriter and guitarist 
1951 – Yasumasa Morimura, Japanese painter and photographer
1952 – Yekaterina Podkopayeva, Russian runner
  1952   – Donnie Van Zant, American singer-songwriter and guitarist 
1953 – Steve Bassam, Baron Bassam of Brighton, English politician
  1953   – José Bové, French farmer and politician
1954 – John Dyson, Australian cricketer
  1954   – Johnny Neel, American singer-songwriter and keyboard player
1955 – Yuriy Sedykh, Ukrainian hammer thrower (d. 2021)
  1955   – Duncan Steel, English-Australian astronomer and author
1956 – Joe Montana, American football player and sportscaster
1959 – Hugh Laurie, English actor and screenwriter 
1960 – Mehmet Oz, American surgeon, author, and television host 
1962 – Mano Menezes, Brazilian footballer and coach 
1963 – Gioia Bruno, American singer-songwriter
  1963   – Sandra Schmirler, Canadian curler and sportscaster (d. 2000)
1964 – Jean Alesi, French race car driver
  1964   – Kim Gallagher, American runner (d. 2002)
1965 – Georgios Bartzokas, Greek former professional basketball player
  1965   – Gavin Hill, New Zealand rugby player 
1966 – Bruce Robison, American country music singer-songwriter and guitarist
1967 – Graeme Bachop, New Zealand rugby player 
  1967   – João Garcia, Portuguese mountaineer
1968 – Alois, Hereditary Prince of Liechtenstein
  1968   – Manoa Thompson, Fijian rugby player
1969 – Peter Dinklage, American actor and producer 
  1969   – Olaf Kapagiannidis, German footballer
1971 – Vladimir Gaidamașciuc, Moldovan footballer
  1971   – Liz Kendall, British politician
  1971   – Mark Richardson, New Zealand cricketer 
1972 – Stephen Kearney, New Zealand rugby league player and coach
1973 – José Manuel Abundis, Mexican footballer and coach
1974 – Fragiskos Alvertis, Greek basketball player, coach, and manager
1976 – Reiko Tosa, Japanese runner
1977 – Geoff Ogilvy, Australian golfer
1978 – Joshua Jackson, Canadian-American actor 
  1978   – Daryl Tuffey, New Zealand cricketer 
1979 – Ali Boussaboun, Moroccan-Dutch footballer
  1979   – Amy Duggan, Australian footballer and sportscaster
1980 – Yhency Brazoban, Dominican baseball player 
1981 – Emiliano Moretti, Italian footballer
  1981   – Kristo Tohver, Estonian footballer and referee
1982 – Vanessa Boslak, French pole vaulter
  1982   – Jacques Freitag, South African high jumper
  1982   – Joey Graham, American basketball player
  1982   – Stephen Graham, American basketball player
  1982   – Reni Maitua, Australian rugby league player 
  1982   – Eldar Rønning, Norwegian skier
  1982   – Diana Taurasi, American basketball player
1983 – Chuck Hayes, American basketball player
  1983   – José Reyes, Dominican baseball player
1984 – Andy Lee, Irish boxer
  1984   – Vágner Love, Brazilian footballer
1985 – Tim Hoogland, German footballer
1986 – Sebastian Bayer, German long jumper
  1986   – Shia LaBeouf, American actor
1987 – Marsel İlhan, Turkish tennis player
  1987   – Didrik Solli-Tangen, Norwegian singer
1988 – Jesús Fernández Collado, Spanish footballer
  1988   – Yui Aragaki, Japanese actress, voice actress, singer-songwriter, model, radio host
1989 – Maya Moore, American basketball player
1990 – Christophe Lemaitre, French sprinter
1991 – Daniel Howell, English YouTuber
1993 – Brittany Boyd, American basketball player
1994 – Ivana Baquero, Spanish actress
1996 – Ayaka Sasaki, Japanese singer 
1998 – Charlie Tahan, American actor
1999 – Eartha Cumings, Scottish footballer
2004 – Katrina Scott, American tennis player

Deaths

Pre-1600
323 BC – Alexander the Great, Macedonian king (b. 356 BC)
 573 – Emilian of Cogolla, Iberic saint (b. 472)
 786 – Al-Husayn ibn Ali al-Abid, anti-Abbasid rebel leader
 840 – Junna, emperor of Japan (b. 785)
 884 – Shi Jingsi, general of the Tang Dynasty
888 – Rimbert, archbishop of Bremen (b. 830)
1183 – Henry the Young King of England (b. 1155)
1216 – Henry of Flanders, emperor of the Latin Empire (b. c. 1174)
1248 – Adachi Kagemori, Japanese samurai
1253 – Amadeus IV, count of Savoy (b. 1197)
1298 – Yolanda of Poland (b. 1235)
1323 – Berengar Fredol the Elder, French lawyer and bishop (b. 1250) 
1345 – Alexios Apokaukos, chief minister of the Byzantine Empire
1347 – Bartholomew of San Concordio, Italian Dominican canonist and man of letters (b. 1260)
1446 – Henry de Beauchamp, 1st Duke of Warwick (b. 1425)
1479 – John of Sahagun, hermit and saint (b. 1419)
1488 – James III of Scotland (b. 1451)
1557 – John III of Portugal (b. 1502)
1560 – Mary of Guise, queen of James V of Scotland (b. 1515)

1601–1900
1683 – Nikita Pustosvyat, a leader of the Russian Old Believers, beheaded (b. unknown)
1695 – André Félibien, French historian and author (b. 1619)
1712 – Louis Joseph, Duke of Vendôme (b. 1654)
1727 – George I of Great Britain (b. 1660)
1748 – Felice Torelli, Italian painter (b. 1667)
1796 – Samuel Whitbread, English brewer and politician, founded the Whitbread Company (b. 1720)
1847 – John Franklin, English admiral and politician (b. 1786)
1852 – Karl Bryullov, Russian painter (b. 1799)
1859 – Klemens von Metternich, German-Austrian politician, 1st State Chancellor of the Austrian Empire (b. 1773)
1879 – William, Prince of Orange (b. 1840)
1882 – Louis Désiré Maigret, French bishop (b. 1804)
1885 – Matías Ramos Mejía, Argentinian colonel (b. 1810)
1897 – Henry Ayers, English-Australian politician, 8th Premier of South Australia (b. 1821)

1901–present
1903 – Nikolai Bugaev, Russian mathematician and philosopher (b. 1837)
  1903   – Alexander I of Serbia (b. 1876)
  1903   – Draga Mašin, Serbian wife of Alexander I of Serbia (b. 1864)
1911 – James Curtis Hepburn, American physician and missionary (b. 1815)
1913 – Mahmud Shevket Pasha, Ottoman general and politician, 279th Grand Vizier of the Ottoman Empire (b. 1856)
1914 – Adolphus Frederick V, Grand Duke of Mecklenburg-Strelitz (b. 1848)
1920 – William F. Halsey, Sr., American captain (b. 1853)
1924 – Théodore Dubois, French organist, composer, and educator (b. 1837)
1927 – William Attewell, English cricketer (b. 1861)
1934 – Lev Vygotsky, Belarusian-Russian psychologist and theorist (b. 1896)
1936 – Robert E. Howard, American author and poet (b. 1906)
1937 – R. J. Mitchell, English engineer, designed the Supermarine Spitfire (b. 1895)
1941 – Daniel Carter Beard, American author and illustrator, founded the Boy Scouts of America (b. 1850)
1955 – Pierre Levegh, French race car driver (b. 1905)
1962 – Chhabi Biswas, Indian actor and director (b. 1900)
1963 – Thích Quảng Đức, Vietnamese monk and martyr (b. 1897)
1965 – Paul B. Coremans, Belgian chemist and academic (b. 1908)
  1965   – José Mendes Cabeçadas, Portuguese admiral and politician, 9th President of Portugal (b. 1883)
1970 – Frank Laubach, American missionary and mystic (b. 1884)
1974 – Eurico Gaspar Dutra, Brazilian general and politician, 16th President of Brazil (b. 1883)
  1974   – Julius Evola, Italian philosopher and author (b. 1898)
1976 – Jim Konstanty, American baseball player (b. 1917)
1979 – Alice Dalgliesh, Trinidadian-American author and publisher (b. 1893)
  1979   – John Wayne, American actor, director, and producer (b. 1907)
1982 – H. Radclyffe Roberts, American entomologist (b. 1906)
1983 – Ghanshyam Das Birla, Indian businessman and politician (b. 1894)
1984 – Enrico Berlinguer, Italian politician (b. 1922)
1986 – Chesley Bonestell, American painter and illustrator (b. 1888)
1991 – Cromwell Everson, South African composer (b. 1925)
1992 – Rafael Orozco Maestre, Colombian singer (b. 1954)
1993 – Ray Sharkey, American actor (b. 1952)
1994 – A. Thurairajah, Sri Lankan engineer and academic (b. 1934)
1995 – Rodel Naval, Filipino singer-songwriter and actor (b. 1953)
1996 – George Hees, Canadian politician (b. 1910)
  1996   – Brigitte Helm, German-Swiss actress (b. 1908)
1998 – Catherine Cookson, English author (b. 1906)
1999 – DeForest Kelley, American actor and screenwriter (b. 1920)
2001 – Timothy McVeigh, American terrorist (b. 1968)
  2001   – Amalia Mendoza, Mexican singer and actress (b. 1923)
2003 – David Brinkley, American journalist and author (b. 1920)
2004 – Egon von Fürstenberg, Swiss fashion designer (b. 1946)
2005 – Vasco Gonçalves, Portuguese general and politician, 103rd Prime Minister of Portugal (b. 1922)
  2005   – Anne-Marie Alonzo, Canadian playwright, poet, novelist, critic and publisher (b. 1951)
2006 – Neroli Fairhall, New Zealand archer (b. 1944)
  2006   – Bruce Shand, English soldier (b. 1917)
2007 – Imre Friedmann, American biologist and academic (b. 1921)
  2007   – Mala Powers, American actress (b. 1931)
2008 – Ove Andersson, Swedish race car driver (b. 1938)
  2008   – Võ Văn Kiệt, Vietnamese soldier and politician, 5th Prime Minister of Vietnam (b. 1922)
2011 – Eliyahu M. Goldratt, Israeli physicist and engineer (b. 1947)
  2011   – Seth Putnam, American singer-songwriter and guitarist (b. 1968)
2012 – Ann Rutherford, Canadian-American actress (b. 1917)
  2012   – Teófilo Stevenson, Cuban boxer and engineer (b. 1952)
2013 – Miller Barber, American golfer (b. 1931)
  2013   – Carl W. Bauer, American lawyer and politician (b. 1933)
  2013   – Robert Fogel, American economist and academic, Nobel Prize laureate (b. 1926)
  2013   – James Grimsley, Jr., American general (b. 1921)
  2013   – Rory Morrison, English journalist (b. 1964)
  2013   – Kristiāns Pelšs, Latvian ice hockey player (b. 1992)
  2013   – Vidya Charan Shukla, Indian politician, Indian Minister of External Affairs (b. 1929)
2014 – Ruby Dee, American actress (b. 1922)
  2014   – Rafael Frühbeck de Burgos, Spanish conductor and composer (b. 1933)
  2014   – Susan B. Horwitz, American computer scientist, engineer, and academic (b. 1955)
  2014   – Mipham Chokyi Lodro, Tibetan lama and educator (b. 1952)
  2014   – Benjamin Mophatlane, South African businessman (b. 1973)
  2014   – Carlton Sherwood, American soldier and journalist (b. 1947)
2015 – Jim Ed Brown, American singer-songwriter and guitarist (b. 1934)
  2015   – Ornette Coleman, American saxophonist, violinist, trumpet player, and composer (b. 1930)
  2015   – Ian McKechnie, Scottish footballer and manager (b. 1941)
  2015   – Ron Moody, English actor and singer (b. 1924)
  2015   – Dusty Rhodes, American wrestler (b. 1945)
2016 – Rudi Altig, German track and road racing cyclist (b. 1937)
2020 – Stella Pevsner, children's author (b. 1921)
2022 – Hilary Devey, English businesswoman, television presenter (b. 1957)

Holidays and observances
American Evacuation Day (Libya)
Brazilian Navy commemorative day (Brazil)
Christian feast day:
Barnabas the Apostle 
Bartholomew the Apostle (Eastern Christianity)
Blessed Ignatius Maloyan (Armenian Catholic Church)
Paula Frassinetti
Riagail of Bangor
June 11 (Eastern Orthodox liturgics)
Davis Day (Cape Breton, Nova Scotia, Canada)
King Kamehameha I Day (Hawaii, United States)
Student Day (Honduras)

References

External links

 
 
 

Days of the year
June